Evenes is a village in Evenes Municipality in Nordland county, Norway. The village is the location of the historic Evenes Church.

References

Evenes
Villages in Nordland
Populated places of Arctic Norway